Daviess County Courthouse is a historic courthouse located at Washington, Daviess County, Indiana.  It was built in 1927–1928 in the Classical Revival style.  It is a two-story, rectangular brick building sheathed in Bedford limestone.  It measures approximately 80 feet by 124 feet, and has a flat roof and slightly projecting colonnaded pavilions, one with six freestanding Ionic order columns. The original second floor courtroom was damaged by fire in 1985. 

Also on the property are the contributing Confederate Monument in Owensboro on the southwest corner of the lawn (1900) and flagpole (1929).

It was added to the National Register of Historic Places in 2008.

References

Washington, Indiana
County courthouses in Indiana
Courthouses on the National Register of Historic Places in Indiana
Neoclassical architecture in Indiana
Government buildings completed in 1928
Buildings and structures in Daviess County, Indiana
National Register of Historic Places in Daviess County, Indiana
1928 establishments in Indiana